Shami Hassan (Arabic:شامي حسن; born 8 March 1984) is a Qatari footballer who plays as a defender.

External links
 

Qatari footballers
1984 births
Living people
Al-Wakrah SC players
Al Kharaitiyat SC players
Al-Shahania SC players
Al-Rayyan SC players
Al-Khor SC players
Al Ahli SC (Doha) players
Qatar Stars League players
Qatari Second Division players
Association football defenders